Acacia vassalii, commonly known as Vassal's wattle, is a shrub of the genus Acacia and the subgenus Phyllodineae that is endemic to a small area of south western Australia. It is listed as critically endangered with the World Conservation Union, as endangered according to the Environment Protection and Biodiversity Conservation Act 1999 and as rare flora with the Wildlife Conservation Act 1950 in Western Australia.

Description
Like most species of Acacia it has a phyllodes rather than true leaves. It blooms from June to July and produces yellow flowers.

Taxonomy
The specific epithet honours the French botanist Jacques Vassal. The species was first collected in 1935 from around the Wongan Hills area in 1935 by E.H. Ising. Both Acacia ericifolia and Acacia leptospermoides are quite closely related to A. vassalii.

Distribution
It is native to an area in the Wheatbelt region of Western Australia where it is found growing to sandy or loamy soils. It has a limited range with the bulk of the population found from near Wongan Hills in the south east to around Watheroo further to the north west and is usually a part of low scrub communities. These is a total of  17 known populations composed of a total of around 2033 mature plants with most populations having less than 40 plants.

See also
 List of Acacia species

References

vassalii
Acacias of Western Australia
Taxa named by Bruce Maslin
Plants described in 1978